The 13th Aviation Regiment is a regiment of the United States Army.

1st Battalion, 13th Aviation
The 1st Battalion, 13th Aviation Regiment manages new recruits who have recently graduated basic training and who have reported to Fort Rucker to receive their military occupational specialty identifier before reporting to their first duty station. The battalion orchestrates and implements the majority of enlisted training at Fort Rucker. The 6th Military Police Detachment and an element of the 46th Engineer Battalion is also assigned to 1-13th. Fort Rucker’s military and civilian firefighters are assigned under the 6th MP Detachment.

2nd Battalion, 13th Aviation
The 2nd Battalion, 13th Aviation Regiment, which replaced the Unmanned Aircraft Systems Training Battalion (UASTB)(Provisional), is based at Fort Huachuca, Arizona.  Its primary mission is to train soldiers in the operation and maintenance of the RQ-7B Shadow and MQ-1C Gray Eagle unmanned aircraft systems.  2–13th Aviation is a tenant unit of Fort Huachuca, but its parent unit is the 1st Aviation Brigade at Fort Rucker, Alabama, home of the United States Army Aviation Center of Excellence.

The battalion trains approximately 2,000 Soldiers, Marines, and foreign military students each year.

Formerly part of Company E, 305th Military Intelligence Battalion (E-305th MIB), the Unmanned Aircraft Systems Training Battalion (UASTB) (Provisional) was activated on 19 April 2006 during the transition of authority for UAS training from the U.S. Army Intelligence Center to the U.S. Army Aviation Warfighting Center. The UASTB was later redesignated as the 1-210th Aviation Regiment and was finally redesignated as the 2–13th Aviation Regiment on June 11, 2011.

Alpha Company 
Alpha Company's soldiers train to become Military Occupational Specialty (MOS) 15W Unmanned Aircraft Systems Operators and 15E Unmanned Aircraft Systems Repairers qualified on the RQ-7B Shadow and the MQ-1C Gray Eagle Unmanned Aircraft Systems. Alpha Company's 500+ Soldiers are held to the highest standards of discipline, professionalism, and physical fitness.  To help them meet these standards, Alpha Company relies on Advanced Individual Training Platoon Sergeants, all with Army Aviation backgrounds. Alpha Company also provides administrative, training, and logistical support for the battalion.

Bravo Company 
Bravo Company's mission is to train UAS Operators on the remote operation of the RQ-7B Shadow and the MQ-1C Gray Eagle Unmanned Systems. Bravo Company also oversees the UAS Instructor Operator Course.

Charlie Company 
Charlie Company's mission is to train UAS Repairers on the maintenance, troubleshooting, and electrical theory of the RQ-7B Shadow and the MQ-1C Gray Eagle Unmanned Systems. Charlie Company also oversees the Tactical UAS Warrant Officer Technician Course, UAS Command and Staff Officer Course, and the UAS Platoon Leader Course.

References 

Military units and formations in Arizona
013
Training units and formations of the United States Army